Admas University College may refer to:

Admas University College–Addis Ababa, university in Addis Ababa, Ethiopia
Admas University College–Hargeisa, branch of Admas University College founded in Somaliland, Somalia
Admas University College–Garowe, branch of Admas University College founded in Puntland, Somalia